Wenn der Vater mit dem Sohne is a 1955 West German film directed by Hans Quest.

It was shot at the Tempelhof Studios in Berlin.

Plot summary 
Teddy Lemke is a lodger with Miss Biermann. She has taken the six-year Ulli into her care, whose mother emigrated to America. Teddy Lemke takes good care of the little Ulli – as if he were his own son. When Ulli surprises Teddy with a children's clown costume, which he accidentally found in the attic, Teddy hesitantly  tells the story of his life:  Formerly he was a famous clown who performed together with his son. When the boy died, Teddy ended his career.

Ulli persuades Teddy to return to the stage, and from then on they perform together. Their immediate success leads to an offer for a longer engagement. At this moment Ulli's mother Gerti, who is now married, returns from America to take Ulli back with her. Teddy flees with Ulli from Berlin to Switzerland, pursued by the child's mother, her husband, and several assistants. Finally Ulli moves with his parents to America, and Teddy, who reluctantly comes to terms with it, gives a sad solo performance at the end.

Cast 
Heinz Rühmann as Teddy Lemke
Oliver Grimm (actor) as Ulli
Waltraut Haas as Gerti
Robert Freitag as Roy Bentley
Sybil Werden as Jane
Fita Benkhoff as Fräulein Biermann
Carl-Heinz Schroth as Peepe
Pero Alexander as Donald Crossman
Herbert Kiper as Miller – Agent
Hans Schwarz Jr. as Samson
Rudolf Schündler as Herr im Laden
Heidi Becker as Helga
Arnim Dahl as Kunstspringer

Soundtrack 
René Carol and Detlev Lais "La-Le-Lu" (Music by Heino Gaze, lyrics by Bruno Balz)

External links 

1955 films
1955 comedy-drama films
German comedy-drama films
West German films
1950s German-language films
Films directed by Hans Quest
Circus films
Constantin Film films
Films shot at Tempelhof Studios
1950s German films